The Accounting Hall of Fame is an award "recognizing accountants who are making or have made a significant contribution to the advancement of accounting" since the beginning of the 20th century. Inductees are from both accounting academia and practice. Since its inception in 1950 at The Ohio State University, it has honored 113 influential accounting professors, professional practitioners, and government and business accountants from the United States and other countries.  

Annual inductions to The Accounting Hall of Fame are the customary procedure. However in some years there are no inductions and in others multiple inductions are made.

Selection to The Accounting Hall of Fame is intended to honor and recognize distinguished service and contributions to the progress of accounting in any of its various fields. Evidence of such service includes contributions to accounting research and literature, significant service to professional accounting organizations, wide recognition as an authority in some field of accounting, advancement of accounting education, and public service. A member must have reached a position of eminence from which the nature of his or her contributions may be established.

Now hosted by  the American Accounting Association (AAA), The Accounting Hall of Fame was established in 1950 at The Ohio State University (OSU). In 2017, OSU entered into an agreement with the American Accounting Association to transfer the authority to host of the Hall of Fame to the AAA. Since 2017 The Accounting Hall of Fame Transition Team, appointed by the AAA Board of Directors and chaired by Past-President Bruce Behn, who convenes the electors and administers the process, has made the selections.   

Induction of the 2020 members was held during the virtual Annual Meeting of the American Accounting Association, in August 2020.

Overview 

The Hall of Fame describes: "While selection to the Hall of Fame is intended to honor the people so chosen, it is also intended to be a recognition of distinguished service contributions to the progress of accounting in any of its various fields. Evidence of such service includes contributions to accounting research and literature, significant service to professional accounting organizations, wide recognition as an authority in some field of accounting, advancement of accounting education, and public service. A member must have reached a position of eminence from which the nature of his or her contributions may be judged."

"Election to The Accounting Hall of Fame is perhaps the only longstanding national award for accountants -- and probably the only international one as well -- in which both academic and practicing accountants vie for the same award."

Induction into The Accounting Hall of Fame is one of the higher honors available within accounting academia. The only comparable awards in the United States may be two awards of the American Accounting Association:  the Notable Contributions to Accounting Literature Award Award which has been received by many of the Hall of Fame inductees, and the rare Seminal Contributions to Accounting Literature Award, which has only been awarded seven times. The sublist of inductees who are accounting academics, thus, includes many of the most notable accounting academics. 

An accounting of 36 inductees during the first 26 years of the award identifies that 20 were chiefly active in public accounting (including 6 who were founders of major public accounting firms), 10 were university professors, 4 were government officials (including 3 chief accountants of the SEC), and that 2 were most prominent in industry.

The recipients of the award are otherwise highly decorated: 21 of the first 36 are recipients of the AICPA's highest honor, its Gold Medal award; 15 received the Alpha Kappa Psi Accounting Foundation Award; at least 15 received honorary degrees, one was knighted in England; and one received "the highest honor the U.S. federal government can bestow upon a career civilian employee, the President's Award for Distinguished Federal Civilian Service."

In a keynote speech at the 50th anniversary of the Hall of Fame, hosted by The Ohio State University and The Academy of Accounting Historians, Lynn Turner, then chief accountant of the United States Securities and Exchange Commission (Washington D.C.), noted the influence of George O. May and numerous other recipients upon the evolution of accounting and auditing practice and principles "that makes our system of accounting the greatest in the world".

The award has always been intended to honor world-level contributions.  The majority of recipients have been Americans, perhaps reflecting the historic leadership of America in the development of accounting regulations and in formal accounting research as much as reflecting the U.S.-based hosting of the award.  Accounting standards co-evolved with the New York Stock Exchange and other public financial markets which have a scale and history in the U.S. not matched by public markets in most other countries.  Englishman Sir Arthur Lowes Dickinson was one of the earliest inductees, honored in 1951 for establishing principles of consolidated accounting for conglomerate companies such as U.S. Steel while he was senior partner of Price-Waterhouse in the U.S. during 1901 to 1913.  The first Canadian inducted was Howard Irwin Ross in 1977.  The first woman inducted was Katherine Schipper in 2007.

Inductees
As of 2022, there are 113 inducted members of The Accounting Hall of Fame: Click the asterisk by each member's name to go to the American Accounting Association's website and learn more about them.

References

Further reading 
 Burns, Thomas J., and Edward N. Coffman. "The Accounting Hall of Fame: A Profile of the Members".  Journal of Accounting Research (Autumn 1976): 342-47.
 Burns, Thomas J., and Edward N. Coffman. "Accounting Hall of Fame," ''History of Accounting: An International Encyclopedia," edited by Michael Chatfield and Richard Vangermeersch. New York: Garland Publishing. pp. 9–10.]
 Jenson, Daniel L. "Historical Notes on the Accounting Hall of Fame"

External links
American Accounting Association, official site

Business and industry awards
Accounting organizations
Halls of fame in Ohio
History of accounting
Businesspeople halls of fame